Stash may refer to:

Music
 Stash (band), a Belgian music band
 Stash Records, a defunct American independent jazz record label
 Stash (Bongzilla album), 1999
 Stash (Phish album), 1996
 Stash (EP), a 2002  EP by Cypress Hill
 "Stash" (song), on Tyga's album Legendary

Businesses
 Stash (company)
 Stash Hotel Rewards
 Stash Tea Company

Computing and technology
 Stash (software), Git repository management service
 Symbol Table hASH, in Perl programming language

Other uses
 Mamyr Stash (born 1993), Russian racing cyclist
 Major Stash, a ring name, along with Van Hammer, of American retired professional wrestler Mark Hildreth (born 1967)
 Stash (graffiti artist) (Josh Franklin, born 1967), American
 Stash: No Loot Left Behind, a role-playing video game released in 2017

See also
 Stach (disambiguation)
 Stache, a short form of moustache